Ludovico  is an Italian masculine given name.  It is sometimes spelled Lodovico. The feminine equivalent is Ludovica.

Persons with the name Ludovico

Given name
 Ludovico D'Aragona (1876–1961), Italian socialist politician
 Ludovico Ariosto (1474–1533), Italian poet
 Ludovico Avio (1932–1996), Argentine football forward 
 Ludovico Baille (1764–1839), Italian historian
 Ludovico Balbi (1540–1604), Italian composer
 Ludovico Barassi (1873–1953), Italian jurist
 Ludovico Barbo (1381–1443), Italian monastic life reformer
 Ludovico Bertonio (1552–1625), Italian Jesuit missionary
 Ludovico Bidoglio (1900–1970), Argentinian footballer
 Ludovico Brea (c. 1450–c. 1523), Italian painter
 Ludovico di Breme (1780–1820), Italian writer
 Ludovico Ottavio Burnacini (1636–1707), Italian architect and stage designer
 Ludovico Buti (c. 1560–after 1611), Italian painter
 Ludovico Camangi (1903–1976), Italian politician
 Lodovico Campalastro, Italian painter
 Ludovico di Caporiacco (1901–1951), Italian arachnologist
 Ludovico Carracci (1555–1619), Italian painter, etcher, and printmaker
 Ludovico of Casoria (1814–1885), Italian Franciscan friar
 Ludovico Cavaleri (1867–1942), Italian painter
 Ludovico Chigi Albani della Rovere (1866–1951), Grand Master of the Sovereign Military Order of Malta
 Ludovico Costa (fl. 1648-1657), Italian painter
 Ludovico David (born 1648), Italian painter
 Ludovico Donato (died c. 1385), Italian cardinal
 Ludovico Einaudi (born 1955), Italian pianist and composer
 Ludovico Fremont (1982), Italian actor
 Ludovico Furconio, Roman Catholic prelate who served as Bishop of Giovinazzo (1528-1549)
 Ludovico de Filippi (1872–1918), Italian naval officer and a pioneer of Italian aviation
 Ludovico Geymonat (1908–1991), Italian Marxist philosopher
 Ludovico Giamagna (1594–1634), Roman Catholic prelate who served as Bishop of Ston
 Ludovico Gimignani (1643–1697), Italian painter
 Ludovico Gonzaga (disambiguation), multiple people, including:
Ludovico I Gonzaga (1268–1360), better known as Luigi, the first Capitano del Popolo of Mantua and Imperial Vicar
Ludovico II Gonzaga (1334–1382), Italian politician who was Capitano del Popolo of Mantua
Ludovico III Gonzaga (1412–1478), ruler of Mantua, Italy
Ludovico Gonzaga (1480-1540) (c. 1480–1540), Italian nobleman and condottiero
 Ludovico Gonzaga-Nevers, (1539–1595), Duke of Nevers from 1565
 Ludovico Lana (c. 1597–1646), Italian painter
 Ludovico Lipparini (1800–1856), Italian painter
 Ludovico Ludovisi (1595–1632), Italian cardinal and statesman
 Ludovico de Luigi (born 1933), Italian sculptor and painter
 Ludovico Madruzzo (1532–1600), Italian cardinal and statesman
 Ludovico Manin (1725–1802), Doge of Venice
 Ludovico Mazzanti (1686–1775), Italian painter
 Ludovico Mazzolino (1480–c. 1528), Italian painter
 Ludovico Micara (1775–1847), Italian cardinal
 Ludovico Moresi (born 1980), Italian footballer
 Ludovico Antonio Muratori (1672–1750), Italian historian
 Ludovico Nitoglia (born 1983), Italian rugby union player
 Ludovico Pasquali, (c. 1500–1551), Italian writer
 Ludovico Prodocator (died 1504), Italian cardinal
 Ludovico Racaniello (1352–1441), Italian condottiero
 Lodovico Rocca (1895–1986), Italian composer
 Ludovico Roncalli (1654–1713), Italian nobleman and composer
 Ludovico Rusconi Sassi (1678–1736), Italian architect
 Ludovico Sabbatini (1650–1724), Italian priest and religious educator
 Ludovico I of Saluzzo (c. 1416–1475), marquess of Saluzzo
 Ludovico II of Saluzzo (1438–1504), Count of Carmagnola and marquess of Saluzzo
 Ludovico Scarfiotti (1933–1968), Italian sports car driver
 Ludovico Sforza (1452–1508), member of the Sforza dynasty of the Duchy of Milan
 Ludovico Maria Sinistrari (1622–1701), Italian Franciscan priest and author
 Ludovico Tommasi (1866–1941), Italian painter
 Ludovico de Torres (disambiguation), multiple people, including:
Ludovico de Torres (cardinal) (1552-1609), Roman Catholic cardinal
Ludovico de Torres (archbishop) (1533–1583), Roman Catholic archbishop
 Ludovico Trasi (1634–1694), Italian painter
 Ludovico Trevisan (1401–1465), Italian catholic prelate
 Ludovico di Varthema (c. 1470–1517), Italian traveller and writer
 Ludovico Vicentino degli Arrighi (1475–1527), papal scribe and type designer

Surname
 Alessandro Ludovico (born 1969), artist, media critic and magazine editor in chief 
 Pedro Ludovico (1891–1979), founder of Goiânia, Brazil

Other uses
 The fictional Ludovico technique of psychological conditioning from the novel and film A Clockwork Orange
 Ludovico Technique LLC, an art and entertainment production company
 Lodovico, Kinsman to Brabantio, cousin to Desdemona in the play Othello
 A rap album by Şanışer

See also
 Lodovico

Surnames
Italian masculine given names
Spanish masculine given names